A combat support hospital (CSH, pronounced "cash") is a type of modern United States Army field hospital. The CSH is transportable by aircraft and trucks and is normally delivered to the Corps Support Area in standard military-owned demountable containers (MILVAN) cargo containers. Once transported, it is assembled by the staff into a tent hospital to treat patients.  Depending upon the operational environment (e.g., battlefield), a CSH might also treat civilians and wounded enemy soldiers. The CSH is the successor to the mobile army surgical hospital.

From November 2017, the United States Army and United States Army Reserve began reorganizing combat support hospitals into smaller, modular units called "field hospitals".

Facility
The size of a combat support hospital is not limited, since tents can be chained together; it will typically deploy with between 44 and 248 hospital beds, with 44 beds being most common. For patient care the CSH is climate-controlled, and has pharmacy, laboratory, X-Ray (often including a CT Scanner) and dental capabilities (ATP 4-02.5 Casualty Care, May 2013). It provides its own power from generators.

The great operational advantage of the deployable medical systems (DEPMEDS) facility is the use of single or double expanding ISO containers or units to create hard-sided, air conditioned, sterile operating rooms and intensive care facilities, which can produce surgical outcomes similar to that seen in fixed facility hospitals, and do so in an austere environment.

Function
Because they are large and relatively difficult to move, combat support hospitals are not the front line of battlefield medicine.  Battalion aid stations, the medical companies of brigade support battalions and forward surgical teams are usually the first point of contact medical care for wounded soldiers. The CSH receives most patients via helicopter air ambulance, and stabilizes these patients for further treatment at fixed facility hospitals. Ideally, the CSH is located as the bridge between incoming helicopter ambulances and outgoing air force aircraft.

The CSH is capable of providing definitive care for many cases.  Current medical doctrine does not encourage wounded soldiers, if they are not expected to quickly return to operational status, to stay in the combat zone.  This is a pragmatic decision as the resources are usually available to bring them home quickly. Military aircraft constantly fly into a theater of operations loaded with equipment and supplies, but often lack a back cargo. Given that adequate "airlift" is usually present, it is easy to evacuate wounded promptly.  For this reason the CSH bed capacity is not as heavily used as in past conflicts.

The CSH will generally have a ground ambulance company attached.  This company consists of approximately four platoons of ground ambulances commanded by a Medical Service Corps officer.  The ground ambulance company in cooperation with available air ambulances (MEDEVAC) is responsible for the movement of sick and wounded from the battalion aid station and other forward-deployed locations to the CSH, as well as evacuation through an established medical treatment chain leading ultimately, for those seriously sick or wounded, to hospitals in the Continental United States in cooperation with resources in the U.S. Air Force.

The CSH is larger than its predecessor, the mobile army surgical hospital. It is commanded by a colonel, rather than a lieutenant colonel.

A fully manned CSH has over 600 people when fully staffed 248 beds. The modular nature of the organization allows for partial deployments, and the full unit is not often deployed (ATP 4.02-5 Casualty Care, May 2013).

History and past configurations
In 1973 and 1974, the 28th Surgical Hospital (Mobile) (Army) (MASH) helped phase-in new designs for operating rooms and patient facilities from the previous canvas tents. Since then all other configurations of army deployable hospitals have been inactivated or reconfigured to the CSH configuration. The last to convert was the 212th Mobile Army Surgical Hospital.

In the mid 1970s the "MUST" designation was applied, (medical unit, self contained, transportable). During the Cold War, with conflict possible against the Soviet Union and Warsaw Pact, active duty MUST units were staffed by all the basic personnel necessary (medics, X-ray techs, pharmacists, cooks, clerks etc.) Doctors, nurses and specialists would be mobilized and mate up with the unit in the field. The unit would be flown to West Germany, withdraw pre-positioned complete hospital MUST equipment and military vehicles from warehouses and then deploy. It contained all necessary functions to provide care for 200 beds, including two intensive care units, eight medical wards, an emergency room, four operating rooms, an orthopedic room, a laboratory, an X-ray, a pharmacy and the unit's transport vehicles. It consisted of hard containers, which would be transported to the designated site, then the wheels would be removed and then expanded. They housed the operating rooms, laboratory, X-ray, and pharmacy. Inflatable shelters were used to provide double wall insulated areas for the patient care areas of the hospital. These "inflatables" required a power system called a "utility pack" (also known as a "U-pack" or "power station") to provide utility services, heat, cooling, inflation, hot water, and filtered air from CBR contaminants.  The utility pack (power plant, utility, gas turbine engine driven - Libby Welding Co. Model LPU-71, Airesearch Model PPU85-5, AmerTech Co. Model APP-1, or Hollingsworth Model JHTWX10/96), powered by a centrifugal flow gas turbine engine, provided electricity (60 Hz AC, 400 Hz AC, and 24vdc). At 250 beds the hospital required eight U-packs. Each consumed 30 gallons of jet fuel per hour. After several years of using inflatables they were abandoned in the mid 1980s, largely due to the weight of the inflatables, and the amount of fuel required just to keep the tents from collapsing.

Under the 1980s "Army of Excellence" Table of Organization and Equipment, the MASHs had the task of providing enough emergency, life-saving surgery so that patients could live to be evacuated to hospitals further to the rear from the fighting line. The Combat Support Hospitals were 200+ bed hospitals that, after the MASHs, were next closest to the front line. The CSHs "specialize[d] in performing surgery on patients whose condition [was] not life-threatening." Behind the CSHs, but still within the Corps rear area, were the 400-bed evacuation hospitals, which provided resuscitative and restorative care.  The basis of allocation for planning purposes was one MASH, one CSH, and two EVAC hospitals per division supported, for a total of 1,060 beds per division. General Hospitals in the Communications Zone (if one were established) or in the Continental United States would provide definitive care.  Actual bed requirements would be driven by combat intensity and the theater evacuation policy.

Hospital Centers
 9th Hospital Center (United States)  (Fort Hood, Texas) Previously 21st Combat Support Hospital-deployed to New York in response to COVID 19
 29th Hospital Center (United States) (Joint Base Lewis-McChord) Previously 47th Combat Support Hospital.

Field Hospitals 
 10th Field Hospital (Fort Carson, Colorado) - part of 627th Hospital Center
 11th Field Hospital  (Fort Hood, Texas) - Formerly 21st EVAC, redesignated 21st CSH 1992; converted to 11th FH 2019 in 2017-2019 assigned to 9th HC.
 115th Field Hospital (Fort Polk, Louisiana) 
 131st Field Hospital (Fort Bliss, Texas) - previously 31st Combat Support Hospital, reorganized and redesignated April 2018. 528th Hospital Center also established.
 147th Field Hospital (Joint Base Lewis-McChord, Washington - previously 47th Combat Support Hospital, reorganized and redesignated September 2021. 29th Hospital Center also established.
 586th Field Hospital (Fort Campbell, Kentucky) - ordered to prepare-to-deploy status by March 23, 2020, in response to the COVID-19 pandemic in the United States. converted from 86th CSH and part of 531st Hospital Center. * 586th Field Hospital (Fort Campbell, Kentucky) - traces history to 1928. Reorganized and redesignated on 16 November 1993 as the 86th Combat Support Hospital.

Combat Support Hospitals 
 14th Combat Support Hospital (14th CSH) (Fort Benning, Georgia)
 28th Combat Support Hospital (Fort Bragg, North Carolina)
 47th Combat Support Hospital  (Fort Lewis, Washington) - by March 23, 2020, ordered to prepare to deploy, in response to the COVID-19 pandemic in the United States.

Reserves / National Guard
 75th Combat Support Hospital (75th CSH) (Tuscaloosa, Alabama)
94th Combat Support Hospital (94th CSH) (Seagoville, Texas) (Switching to 394th Field Hospital in 2022)
 228th Combat Support Hospital (228th CSH) (Fort Sam Houston, Texas)
 256th Combat Support Hospital (256th CSH) (Twinsburg, Ohio)
 325th Combat Support Hospital (325th CSH) (Independence, Missouri)
 328th Combat Support Hospital (328th CSH) (Fort Douglas, Utah)
 345th Combat Support Hospital (345th CSH) (Jacksonville, FL)
 349th Combat Support Hospital (349th CSH) (Bell, California)
 352nd Combat Support Hospital (352nd CSH) (Camp Parks, California)
 396th Combat Support Hospital (396th CSH) (Vancouver, Washington)
 399th Combat Support Hospital (399th CSH) (Fort Devens, Massachusetts)
 405th Combat Support Hospital (405th CSH) (Worcester, Massachusetts)
 452nd Combat Support Hospital (452nd CSH) (Milwaukee, Wisconsin)
 801st Combat Support Hospital (801st CSH) (Fort Sheridan, Illinois) 
 865th Combat Support Hospital (865th CSH) (Utica, New York)

Overseas
 121st Field Hospital (121st FH) (Camp Humphreys, Pyeongtaek, South Korea) part of 549th Hospital Center
502D Field Hospital (502D FH) (Camp Humphreys, Pyeongtaek, South Korea) part of 549th Hospital Center
 212th Combat Support Hospital (212th CSH) (Rhine Ordnance Barracks, Germany)

Former
Active duty combat support hospitals
 4th Combat Support Hospital (4th CSH) (Fort McClellan, Alabama)
 5th Combat Support Hospital (5th CSH) (Fort Bragg, North Carolina)
 16th Combat Support Hospital (16th CSH) (Fort Riley, Kansas)
 41st Combat Support Hospital (41st CSH) (Fort Sam Houston, Texas)
 46th Combat Support Hospital (46th CSH) (Fort Devens, Massachusetts)
 67th Combat Support Hospital (67th CSH) (Germany)
 128th Combat Support Hospital (128th CSH) (Ludwigsburg, Germany)
Reserves
 48th Combat Support Hospital (48th CSH), reorganized to 410th Hospital Center, November 2017 (Fort George G. Meade, Maryland)
 114th Combat Support Hospital (114th CSH) (Minneapolis, Minnesota) 
 117th Combat Support Hospital, Texas Army National Guard (1976)
 309th Combat Support Hospital (309th CSH) (Hanscom AFB, Massachusetts) 
 337th Combat Support Hospital (337th CSH) (Indianapolis, Indiana) 
 339th Combat Support Hospital (339th CSH) (Coraopolis, Pennsylvania)
 344th Combat Support Hospital (344th CSH) (Fort Totten, New York, transferred to Fort Dix, New Jersey)
 369th Combat Support Hospital (369th CSH) (San Juan, Puerto Rico)  
 376th Combat Support Hospital  (376th CSH)  (Liverpool, NY)
 377th Combat Support Hospital (377th CSH) (Chattanooga, Tennessee)
 401st Combat Support Hospital (401st CSH) (Grand Rapids, Michigan)
 914th Combat Support Hospital (914th CSH) (Columbus, Ohio)

The Army's Center of Military History has accessible online lineages for the 86th Combat Support Hospital
(18 February 2011); the 115th Combat Support Hospital (18 April 2016); 212th Combat Support Hospital (2 July 2013); the 228th Combat Support Hospital (4 December 2002); the 325th Combat Support Hospital (17 March 2015); the 399th Combat Support Hospital
(11 July 1996); the 801st Combat Support Hospital (20 November 2012) and the 914th Combat Support Hospital (11 July 1996).

See also 
 Military medicine
 45th Portable Surgical Hospital
 M*A*S*H
 Ibn Sina Hospital, Baghdad, Iraq
 Casualty Clearing Station
 List of former United States Army medical units

References 

  Dinackus gives a extensive, authoritative listing of many U.S. Army medical headquarters, formations, and units as of 1990-91, with associated clarifying notes, at pages 2–4, 2-5, 10-6, 10-9, and 10-10.
 History of Deployable Medical Systems (DEPMEDS)
 https://mrmc.amedd.army.mil/index.cfm?pageid=media_resources.articles.army_combat_support_hospitals_converting_to_new_modular_field_hospitals

External links 
 Army Combat Support Hospitals Converting to New Modular Field Hospitals' US Army Medical Materials Command
 PBS NOVA: Life and Death in the War Zone
 The Journey, by surgeon E. T. Rulison, Jr., M.D., F.A.C.S., firsthand account and photographs of the 51st Evacuation Hospital during World War II
 The Nurses of the 51st Evac Hospital In WWII, by nurse First Lieutenant Tillie (Horath) Kehrer, firsthand account and photographs of the 51st Evacuation Hospital during World War II
 Author Webcast Interview and Firsthand Account of Rule Number Two: Lessons I Learned in a Combat Hospital based on Dr. Heidi Squier Kraft seven months with a Marine Corps surgical company in Iraq, 
 Lineage and Honors - Hospitals at the United States Army Center of Military History archives

Military medical organizations of the United States
Medical installations of the U.S. Department of Defense
Hospitals of the United States Army
Military hospitals